Überjam Deux is a studio album by American jazz guitarist John Scofield. The record features guitarist and co-producer Avi Bortnick, bass guitarist Andy Hess, drummers Adam Deitch and Louis Cato, and John Medeski on organ, electric piano & mellotron. The album is a follow-up to the “John Scofield Band” albums Überjam (2002) and Up All Night (2003).

Track listing
All songs written by John Scofield, except tracks 1,2,3,5,6,7,9 which were co-written by Avi Bortnick. "Just Don't Want to Be Lonely" (11) was written by Bobby Eli, John C. Freeman and Vinnie Barrett.

Personnel
 John Scofield – electric guitar
 John Medeski – organ, Wurlitzer electric piano, and mellotron
 Avi Bortnick – electric guitar and sampling
 Andy Hess – bass guitar
 Louis Cato – drums
 Adam Deitch – drums

References

2013 albums
Post-bop albums
John Scofield albums